Mihail Ivanov Aleksandrov (born 11 June 1989) is a Bulgarian former footballer who played as a midfielder. He primarily played as a right winger or a right-sided midfielder.

Career

CSKA Sofia
Aleksandrov began his career at CSKA Sofia. He made his debut for the first team in a 2–1 home win over Belasitsa Petrich on 26 November 2006 at the age of 17.

Borussia Dortmund
In August 2007, Aleksandrov was signed by Borussia Dortmund on a three-year contract. After joining Borussia, he played exclusively for the club's reserve team. He made his debut on 7 November 2008 in a 3–1 home victory over Köln II. On 20 March 2010, in a 2–0 away win over Wuppertaler SV Borussia Aleksandrov assisted Marcel Großkreutz for the second goal. He spent most of his time with Borussia II on the bench, making only five appearances.

Akademik Sofia
After his contract expired in late July 2010, Aleksandrov agreed to join Akademik Sofia. He made his debut for Akademik in their match against Sliven 2000 on 21 August, coming on as a second-half substitute for Asparuh Vasilev. He made his first start a week later against Litex Lovech.

Ludogorets Razgrad

On 22 December 2010, Aleksandrov joined Ludogorets Razgrad. On 19 March 2011, he scored a goal in his competitive debut for Ludogorets against Dobrudzha Dobrich.

Aleksandrov began the following 2011–12 season in fine form for Ludogorets. On 20 August he assisted Marcelinho for Ludogorets's third goal in a 4–0 home win over Vidima-Rakovski. Aleksandrov scored his first league goal of the season by netting Ludogorets's third goal in a 6–0 victory over Slavia Sofia on 11 September. On 18 September he scored his second goal of the season, netting the solitary strike in a 1–0 away victory over Cherno More. On 13 October, Aleksandrov signed a new two-year contract with Ludogorets.

On 31 July 2013, Aleksandrov netted the winning goal for Ludogorets in the 2–1 victory over FK Partizan in the first leg of a UEFA Champions League match.

In 2015–16 season Aleksandrov was dropped to the bench, making only four league appearances as a substitute during the first half of the campaign. He scored four goals in six matches for the club's reserve team in the B Group. He scored 4 goals in 6 matches for the team, playing only 3 for the first team.

Legia Warsaw
On 29 February 2016, Aleksandrov signed a one-and-a-half-year contract with Ekstraklasa club Legia Warsaw. He made his debut for the team on 5 March 2016 in a match against Górnik Zabrze won by Legia.

Arsenal Tula
On 10 February 2017, Legia announced the transfer of Aleksandrov to Russian Premier League club FC Arsenal Tula. On 8 July 2018, he extended his contract for another year with an additional 1-year extension option. In the opening game of the 2018–19 season against FC Dynamo Moscow he suffered an ACL tear, even though he didn't even remember the moment of the injury. He recovered from injury in January 2019 and was cleared for training, however, he re-aggravated the injury and the season opening game remained his only appearance of the 2018–19 season for Arsenal. On 9 August 2019, he left Arsenal as his contract expired.

Arda Kardzhali
On 2 September 2019, he signed a one-year contract with Bulgarian club Arda Kardzhali.

International career
In October 2011, Aleksandrov earned his first call-up to the Bulgaria national side for a friendly match against Ukraine and a Euro 2012 qualifier against Wales. He was also selected for a friendly match against Hungary in February 2012, but did not take part in it. Aleksandrov earned his first cap on 5 March 2014, in the 2:1 home win over Belarus in a friendly match.

Career statistics

Club

National team

International goals
As of match played 7 October 2016. Bulgaria score listed first, score column indicates score after each Aleksandrov goal.

Honours

Club 
Ludogorets
 A Group (4): 2011–12, 2012–13, 2013–14, 2014–15
 Bulgarian Cup (2): 2011–12, 2013–14
 Bulgarian Supercup (2): 2012, 2014

Legia Warsaw
 Ekstraklasa (2): 2015–16, 2016–17
 Polish Cup (1): 2015–16

References

External links 

1989 births
Living people
Bulgarian footballers
Bulgaria youth international footballers
Bulgaria international footballers
PFC CSKA Sofia players
Borussia Dortmund II players
Akademik Sofia players
PFC Ludogorets Razgrad players
Legia Warsaw players
FC Arsenal Tula players
FC Arda Kardzhali players
Expatriate footballers in Germany
Expatriate footballers in Poland
Expatriate footballers in Russia
Bulgarian expatriate sportspeople in Germany
Bulgarian expatriate sportspeople in Poland
Bulgarian expatriate sportspeople in Russia
Association football midfielders
First Professional Football League (Bulgaria) players
Second Professional Football League (Bulgaria) players
Ekstraklasa players
Footballers from Sofia
3. Liga players
Regionalliga players
Russian Premier League players